Mary Sue McClurkin (born February 14, 1947) is an American politician who served in the Alabama House of Representatives from 1998 to 2014.

References

1947 births
Living people
Republican Party members of the Alabama House of Representatives
Women state legislators in Alabama
20th-century American politicians
20th-century American women politicians
21st-century American politicians
21st-century American women politicians
People from Abbeville, Alabama